Coptoclavinae is a beetle subfamily in the family Coptoclavidae.

References

External links

Coptoclavidae